Welsh Living is a national bi-monthly home and lifestyle magazine. The magazine began publication in 2006 in the United Kingdom. Founded by Eduardo Pereira, the magazine is predominantly based on homes, gardens, life and style. It is part of Pear Media. Circulation is achieved through distribution at independent news-stand outlets as well as Marks and Spencer, Waitrose, Sainsbury's, WH Smith and other retail outlets.

References

Bi-monthly magazines published in the United Kingdom
Lifestyle magazines published in the United Kingdom
Magazines established in 2006
Magazines published in Wales